Marcelo Augusto Oliveira Chamusca (born 7 October 1966) is a Brazilian professional football manager and former player who played as a defensive midfielder. He is the current manager of Tombense.

He is known for being the only manager who achieved promotions from all tiers of the Campeonato Brasileiro.

Playing career
Born in Salvador, Bahia, Chamusca was a Bahia youth graduate. After spending two years in the first team, he subsequently represented Galícia, Treze and Associação Atlética Colatina, retiring with the latter in 1993.

Managerial career
Immediately after retiring, Chamusca joined Bahia's fierce rivals Vitória's youth setup. In 2000, after a two-year spell at Sport, he returned to Bahia.

Chamusca moved to the assistant role in 2002, and was a director of football of Palmeiras do Nordeste in the following year. His first managerial experience came in 2004, while in charge of CRB.

In July 2004, Chamusca was appointed his brother's assistant at São Caetano. He remained an assistant at Bahia, Goiás, Botafogo, Oita Trinita, Sport, Avaí, Al-Arabi and El Jaish before returning to Brazil in 2012 and being appointed Vitória da Conquista manager.

Chamusca was appointed manager of Salgueiro on 30 November 2012, and achieved promotion in the 2013 Série D.

On 25 November 2013, Chamusca was named at the helm of Fortaleza. After narrowly missing out promotion, he resigned and joined Atlético Goianiense; his reign at the latter only lasted two months, and he returned to Fortaleza on 2 March 2015.

On 4 December 2015, Chamusca was named Sampaio Corrêa manager. Dismissed the following 3 March, he was presented at Guarani on 15 April.

After achieving promotion to the Série B, Chamusca was appointed manager of Paysandu on 2 December 2016. The following 18 June, he resigned and moved to fellow second division team Ceará, and achieved a top tier promotion in the end of the season; by doing so, he became the first manager to achieve promotions in all national tiers of Brazilian football.

On 21 May 2018, Chamusca was sacked by Ceará. On 2 September, he took over Ponte Preta, but was sacked late in the month.

On 14 October 2019, after unsuccessful spells at Vitória and CRB, Chamusca was named in charge of Cuiabá also in the second division. On 11 November of the following year, after impressing with the club in the 2020 Copa do Brasil, he replaced Rogério Ceni at the helm of top tier side Fortaleza, returning to the club for a third spell after nearly five years.

On 7 January 2021, Chamusca was sacked after a poor run of form. On 19 February, he was named at the helm of recently relegated side Botafogo for the 2021 campaign.

On 20 July 2021, after a poor run of form, Chamusca was sacked by Bota. On 18 August, he replaced Hélio dos Anjos at Náutico also in the second division, but left on a mutual agreement on 22 September.

On 18 May 2022, Chamusca returned to Guarani after nearly six years, but was sacked on 25 June after only six matches. On 9 November, he was named in charge of Tombense.

Personal life
Chamusca's older brother, Péricles, is also a former footballer and current manager.

Honours

Player
 Bahia
 Campeonato Baiano U-17: 1985, 1986
 Campeonato Baiano: 1987, 1988

Manager
 Fortaleza
 Campeonato Cearense: 2015

 Paysandu
 Campeonato Paraense: 2017

 Ceará
 Campeonato Cearense: 2018

 Cuiabá
 Copa Verde: 2019

References

External links

1966 births
Living people
Sportspeople from Salvador, Bahia
Brazilian footballers
Association football midfielders
Esporte Clube Bahia players
Galícia Esporte Clube players
Treze Futebol Clube players
Brazilian football managers
Campeonato Brasileiro Série A managers
Campeonato Brasileiro Série B managers
Campeonato Brasileiro Série C managers
Esporte Clube Vitória managers
Sport Club do Recife managers
Esporte Clube Bahia managers
Clube de Regatas Brasil managers
Salgueiro Atlético Clube managers
Fortaleza Esporte Clube managers
Atlético Clube Goianiense managers
Sampaio Corrêa Futebol Clube managers
Guarani FC managers
Paysandu Sport Club managers
Ceará Sporting Club managers
Associação Atlética Ponte Preta managers
Cuiabá Esporte Clube managers
Botafogo de Futebol e Regatas managers
Clube Náutico Capibaribe managers
Tombense Futebol Clube managers